The 1971–72 Alpha Ethniki was the 36th season of the highest football league of Greece. The season began on 19 September 1971 and ended on 25 June 1972. Panathinaikos won their 11th Greek title.

The point system was: Win: 3 points - Draw: 2 points - Loss: 1 point.

League table

Results

Top scorers

External links
Greek Wikipedia
Official Greek FA Site
Greek SuperLeague official Site
SuperLeague Statistics

Alpha Ethniki seasons
Greece
1971–72 in Greek football leagues